The Pan American Judo Championships are continental judo Championships organized by the Pan American Judo Confederation since 2009. Previous championships were organized by the Panamerican Judo Union. From 2022 they are renamed to Pan American-Oceania Judo Championships.

Editions
Also 2009 Pan American Judo Championships (PJU) in Santo Domingo, Dominican Republic was unofficial championships by the IJF.

Juniors

	Name 	Type 	Place 	Date

1 	Pan American Oceania U21 Championships Lima 	PaJCh 	Lima (PER) 	10 Apr 2022

2 	Pan American U21 Championships Cali 	PaJCh 	Cali (COL) 	14 Aug 2021

3 	Pan American U21 Championships Guadalajara 	PaJCh 	Guadalajara (MEX) 	19 Nov 2020

4 	Pan American U21 Championships Cali 	PaJCh 	Cali (COL) 	20 Jul 2019

5 	Pan American U21 Championships La Paz 	PaJCh 	La Paz Cordoba (ARG) 	7 Jul 2018

6 	Pan American U21 Championships Cancun 	PaJCh 	Cancun (MEX) 	1 Jul 2017

7 	Pan American U21 Championships Cordoba 	PaJCh 	Cordoba (ARG) 	2 Jul 2016

8 	Pan American U21 Championships San Salvador 	PaJCh 	San Salvador (ESA) 	12 Jul 2014

9 	Pan American U21 Championships Buenos Aires 	PaJCh 	Buenos Aires (ARG) 	12 Jul 2013

10 	Pan American U20 Championships Buena Vista 	PaJCh 	Buena Vista (USA) 	5 Sep 2010

11 	Pan American U20 Championships 	PaJCh 	San Salvador (ESA) 	13 Jun 2009

12 	Pan American U20 Championships 	PaJCh 	Carolina (PUR) 	24 Mar 2004

13 	Pan American U20 Championships 	PaJCh 	() 	10 Jul 2002

14 	Pan American U20 Championships Acapulco 	PaJCh 	Acapulco (MEX) 	23 Aug 2001

15 	Pan American U20 Championships 	PaJCh 	Maracaibo (VEN) 	21 Jul 1998

16 	Pan American U21 Championships Medellin 	PaJCh 	Medellin (COL) 	1991

17 	Pan American U21 Championships Quito 	PaJCh 	Quito (ECU) 	3 Jun 1989

18 	Pan American U21 Championships Mexico City 	PaJCh 	Mexico City (MEX) 	1987

Cadets

	Name 	Type 	Place 	Date

1 	Pan American Oceania U18 Championships Lima 	PCadet 	Lima (PER) 	9 Apr 2022

2 	Pan American U18 Championships Cali 	PCadet 	Cali (COL) 	13 Aug 2021

3 	Pan American U18 Championships Guadalajara 	PCadet 	Guadalajara (MEX) 	18 Nov 2020

4 	Pan American U18 Championships Cancun 	PCadet 	Cancun (MEX) 	30 Jun 2017

5 	Pan American U18 Championships Cordoba 	PCadet 	Cordoba (ARG) 	1 Jul 2016

6 	Pan American U18 Championships San Salvador 	PCadet 	San Salvador (ESA) 	12 Jul 2014

7 	Pan American U18 Championships Buenos Aires 	PCadet 	Buenos Aires (ARG) 	12 Jul 2013

8 	Pan American U17 Championships Buena Vista 	PCadet 	Buena Vista (USA) 	4 Sep 2010

9 	Pan American U17 Championships San Salvador 	PCadet 	San Salvador (ESA) 	15 May 2009

10 	Pan American U17 Championships Acapulco 	PCadet 	Acapulco (MEX) 	23 Aug 2001

11 	Pan American U17 Championships Tampa 	PCadet 	Tampa (USA) 	28 Aug 1999

12 	Pan American U17 Championships Maracaibo 	PCadet 	Maracaibo (VEN) 	21 Jul 1998

13 	Pan American U17 Championships Quito 	PCadet 	Quito (ECU) 	3 Jun 1989

14 	Pan American U18 Championships Mexico City 	PCadet 	Mexico City (MEX) 	11 Nov 1976

U15

	Name 	Type 	Place 	Date

1 	Pan American U15 Championships Buenos Aires 	PU15 	Buenos Aires (ARG) 	24 Nov 2011

2 	Pan American U15 Championships Panama 	PU15 	Panama City (PAN) 	1 Oct 2010

Medal table (1952–2020)

See also
Judo at the Pan American Games
Pan American Wrestling Championships

References

External links
 Pan American Judo Confederation

 
American Championships
Judo
Recurring sporting events established in 1952